Bocula calthula is a moth of the family Erebidae first described by Swinhoe in 1906. It is found in Borneo and possibly the Philippines.

References

Rivulinae